Maksim Viktorovich Sidorov (born 13 May 1986) is a Russian shot putter.

Career

Sidorov narrowly missed making the final of the shot put at the 2012 IAAF World Indoor Championships, finishing seventh in his qualifying group, and 14th overall with a mark of 19.88 m.

Sidorov took his first senior international championship medal, when he threw 20.55m for bronze at the 2011 European Indoor Championships in Paris. He threw 21.45m on 22 July to win the Russian National Championships. In doing so, he overtook David Storl and Aleksandr Lobynya as the best European outdoor shot putter and best Russian outdoor shot putter respectively in 2011. He also competed at the 2012 Summer Olympics.

In 2017, he tested for a positive for a banned substance Indapamide and was disqualified for a year starting in July 2017.

International competitions

See also
 List of doping cases in athletics

References

External links 
 
 
 
 
 

1986 births
Living people
Russian male shot putters
Olympic male shot putters
Olympic athletes of Russia
Athletes (track and field) at the 2012 Summer Olympics
World Athletics Championships athletes for Russia
Universiade gold medalists for Russia
Universiade gold medalists in athletics (track and field)
Medalists at the 2007 Summer Universiade
Russian Athletics Championships winners
Doping cases in athletics
Russian sportspeople in doping cases
21st-century Russian people